The Rumi calendar (lit. "Roman calendar"), a specific calendar based on the Julian calendar, was officially used by the Ottoman Empire after Tanzimat (1839) and by its successor, the Republic of Turkey until 1926. It was adopted for civic matters and is a solar based calendar, assigning a date to each solar day.

History

In the Islamic state of the Ottoman Empire, the religious Islamic calendar was in use, within which days are numbered within each lunar phase cycle. Because the length of the lunar month is not an even fraction of the length of the tropical year, a purely lunar calendar quickly drifts relative to the seasons.

1677 Introduction of the Fiscal calendar
In 1677, Head Treasurer Hasan Pasha under Sultan Mehmed IV proposed the correction of financial records by dropping one year (an escape year) every 33 years, resulting from the difference between the lunar Islamic calendar and the solar Julian calendar.

In 1740 (1152 AH) during the reign of Sultan Mahmud I, March was adopted as the first month of the fiscal year for the payment of taxes and dealings with government officials instead of Muharram following Treasurer Atıf Efendi's proposal.

Proposed by Treasurer Moralı Osman Efendi during the reign of Sultan Abdul Hamid I, the range of the fiscal calendar applications was extended in 1794 to state expenditures and payments in order to prevent surplus cost arising from the time difference between the Islamic and Julian calendar.

1840 Adoption of the Julian Calendar
The Julian calendar, used from 1677 AD on for fiscal matters only, was adopted on March 13, 1840 AD (March 1, 1256 AH), in the frame of Tanzimat reforms shortly after the accession to the throne of Sultan Abdülmecid I, as the official calendar for all civic matters and named "Rumi calendar" (literally Roman calendar). The counting of years began with the year 622 AD, when Muhammad and his followers emigrated from Mecca to Medina, the same event marking the start of the Islamic calendar. The months and days of the Julian calendar were used, the year starting in March. However, in 1256 AH the difference between the Hijri and the Gregorian calendars amounted to 584 years. With the change from lunar calendar to solar calendar, the difference between the Rumi calendar and the Julian or Gregorian calendar remained a constant 584 years.

1917 Adoption of the Gregorian calendar
Since the Julian to Gregorian calendar changeover was finally being adopted in neighboring countries, the Rumi calendar was realigned to the Gregorian calendar in February 1917, leaving the difference of 584 years unchanged, however. Thus, after February 15, 1332 AH (February 1917 AD), the next day instead of being February 16 suddenly became March 1, 1333 AH (March 1, 1917 AD). The year 1333 AH (1917 AD) was made into a year with only ten months, running from March 1 to December 31. January 1, AD 1918 thus became January 1, AH 1334. The Rumi calendar remained in use after the dissolution of the Ottoman Empire into the first years of the succeeding Republic of Turkey.

1925 Discontinuation of the Rumi calendar
The use of the AH era was abandoned as part of Atatürk's reforms by an act of December 26, 1341 AH (1925 AD) and was replaced by the Gregorian year from 1926.

Calendar months
From 1918 the fiscal year has commenced on 1 January. The other months' names were from the Syriac language, except for Mart, Mayıs, and Ağustos, which were derived from Latin.

1917 Conversion Table
In 1917 (1332-1333), a major calendar reform aligned the Rumi calendar with the Gregorian calendar. This table, adapted from the work of Richard B. Rose, lists the equivalent dates for that year.

See also
 List of calendars
 Islamic calendar
 Solar Hijri calendar
 Tabarian calendar
 Assyrian calendar
 Hebrew calendar
 Persian calendar
 Babylonian calendar
 Pre-Islamic Arabian calendar
 Arabic names of Gregorian months

References

External links
Interconvert Gregorian and Rumi dates

Hijrah-based calendars
Ottoman culture
1926 disestablishments in Turkey